The men's K-2 1000 metres event was a pairs kayaking event conducted as part of the Canoeing at the 1988 Summer Olympics program.

Medalists

Results

Heats
20 crews entered in three heats on September 27. The top three finishers from each of the heats advanced directly to the semifinals. The remaining eleven teams were relegated to the repechage heats.

Repechages
Taking place on September 27, the top three competitors in each of the two repechages advanced to the semifinals.

Semifinals
The top three finishers in each of the three semifinals (raced on September 29) advanced to the final.

Pre-Olympic favorite France was disqualified in the first semifinal for failing to make it to the starting line on time.

Final
The final was held on October 1.

References
1988 Summer Olympics official report Volume 2, Part 2. pp. 339–41. 
Sports-reference.com 1988 K-2 1000 m results.
Wallechinsky, David and Jaime Loucky (2008). "Canoeing: Men's Kayak Pairs 1000 Meters". In The Complete Book of the Olympics: 2008 Edition. London: Aurum Press, Limited. pp. 475–6.

Men's K-2 1000
Men's events at the 1988 Summer Olympics